Moldovan football clubs have participated in European football competitions since 1993.

UEFA country coefficient and ranking

For the 2023–24 UEFA competitions, the associations were allocated places according to their 2022 UEFA country coefficients, which take into account their performance in European competitions from 2017–18 to 2021–22. In the 2022 rankings that are used for the 2023–24 European competitions, Moldova's coefficient points total is 11.250. Moldova is ranked by UEFA as the 33rd association in Europe out of 55.

 31  Slovenia 15.000
 32  Belarus 12.500
 33  Moldova 11.250
 34  Lithuania 10.000
 35  Bosnia and Herzegovina 9.125
 Full list

UEFA country coefficient history

As of 28 May 2022

Active competitions

UEFA Champions League

UEFA Europa League

UEFA Conference League

Defunct competitions

UEFA Cup Winners' Cup

UEFA Intertoto Cup

Overall recordAs of 16 March 2023By competition

By country
Moldovan clubs have not yet faced opponents from Gibraltar, Kosovo and San Marino.

Other European competition

UEFA Youth League
{| class="wikitable sortable collapsible collapsed" style="text-align: center; font-size: 83%;"
! width="80"|Season
! width="150"|Club
! width="150|Round
! width="150"|Opponent
! width="53|Home
! width="53|Away
! width="80|Agg.
!
|-
| 2015–16
| Zimbru Chișinău
| First round
| align="left" | Příbram
| bgcolor="#ffdddd"|1–2
| bgcolor="#ffdddd"|0–2
| 1–4
| 
|-
|-bgcolor=#EEEEEE
| 2016–17
| Sheriff Tiraspol
| First round
| align="left" | Viitorul Constanța
| bgcolor="#ffdddd"|0–1
| bgcolor="#ffdddd"|1–4
| 1–5
| 
|-
| rowspan=2|2017–18
| rowspan=2|Zimbru Chișinău
| First round
| align="left" | Vllaznia Shkodër
| bgcolor="#ddffdd"|3–1
| bgcolor="#ddffdd"|4–2
| 7–3
| 
|-
| Second round
| align="left" | Molde
| bgcolor="#ffffdd"|0–0
| bgcolor="#ffdddd"|0–2
| 0–2
| 
|-
|-bgcolor=#EEEEEE
| 2018–19
| Sheriff Tiraspol
| First round
| align="left" | Gabala
| bgcolor="#ffdddd"|1–3
| bgcolor="#ffffdd"|1–1
| 2–4
| 
|-
| rowspan=3|2019–20
| rowspan=3|Sheriff Tiraspol
| First round
| align="left" | Shkëndija Tiranë
| bgcolor="#ddffdd"|1–0
| bgcolor="#ddffdd"|2–1
| 3–1
| 
|-
| Second round
| align="left" | Sogndal
| bgcolor="#ddffdd"|2–0
| bgcolor="#ffdddd"|1–3
| 3–3 (a)
| 
|-
| Play-off round
| align="left" | Crvena zvezda
| bgcolor="#ffffdd"|0–0 (2–4 p)
| 
| 
| 
|-
|-bgcolor=#EEEEEE
| rowspan=4|2021–22
| rowspan=4|Sheriff Tiraspol
|-
|-bgcolor=#EEEEEE
| rowspan=3| Group D
| align="left" | Inter
| bgcolor="#ffdddd"|2–4
| bgcolor="#ffdddd"|1–2
| rowspan=3| 4th
| rowspan=3| 
|-bgcolor=#EEEEEE
| align="left" | Real Madrid
| bgcolor="#ffdddd"|0–1
| bgcolor="#ffdddd"|1–4
|-bgcolor=#EEEEEE
| align="left" | Shakhtar Donetsk
| bgcolor="#ffdddd"|0–5
| bgcolor="#ffdddd"|0–6
|}

Overall recordAs of 7 December 2021''

By competition

By country

See also
Moldovan women's football clubs in European competitions

References

External links
UEFA Website

European football clubs in international competitions